Teodor Jerzy Panek (born 22 July 1946) known in Poland as Jerzy Panek and in the United States as Jerry Panek is a retired Polish-American football who played as a midfielder who earned three caps with the U.S. national team in 1973.  He currently coaches youth soccer in Wisconsin.

Player
In Poland he played for the Broń Radom, AZS-AWF Warszawa and Lechia Gdańsk.

Professional
In 1975, Panek played for the Chicago Sting in the North American Soccer League.  He also played for the Chicago Cats of the American Soccer League that season.

National team
Panek’s three national team games all came against Poland in 1973.  The first was a 1-0 loss on August 3.  The second was a 4-0 loss on August 10.  Panek was replaced by Paul Child in the 60th minute.  The last was a 1-0 victory on August 12.  Panek was again replaced, this time by Stefan Szefer in the 60th minute.

Coach
Panek coached Milwaukee Polonia and the Milwaukee Kickers of the Wisconsin Soccer Association.  In 1982, he left the Kickers to become an assistant coach with Marquette University.  When head coach Joe Born resigned during the season, Panek became the head coach on October 6, 1982.  When he resigned at the end of the 1991 season, Panek had compiled a 97-80-20 record.  Panek has also coached at Thomas More High School and was an assistant with the  Milwaukee Rampage.

Panek has since returned to the Milwaukee Kickers Soccer Club, where he has been serving as their director of coaching since 2001.

Panek was inducted into the WASA Hall of Fame in 1991.

Panek attended Academy of Physical Education in Warsaw. He received a coaching license and master's degree in physical education. He is one of the most soccer specific educated coaches in the country.

References

External links
 NASL stats

Lechia Gdańsk players
American Soccer League (1933–1983) players
American soccer coaches
American soccer players
Chicago Cats players
Chicago Sting (NASL) players
Polish emigrants to the United States
Marquette Golden Eagles men's soccer coaches
North American Soccer League (1968–1984) players
United States men's international soccer players
Living people
1956 births
Association football midfielders